Christian Schatz (born 7 October 1975) is an Austrian luger who has competed since 2000. A natural track luger, he won a complete set of medals at the FIL World Luge Natural Track Championships with a gold (Mixed team: 2007), a silver (Mixed team: 2011, and a bronze (Men's doubles: 2007).

Schatz also earned two medals at the FIL European Luge Championships with a silver (men's doubles: 2006) and a bronze (mixed team: 2010).

References
FIL-Luge profile
Natural track European Championships results 1970-2006.
Natural track World Championships results: 1979-2007

External links 

 

1975 births
Living people
Austrian male lugers